Richard Handley (born 1 September 1990) is a British former professional road and track racing cyclist, who rode professionally between 2010 and 2019.

Biography
Handley was born in Wigan.

Major results

2009
 4th Time trial, National Under-23 Road Championships
2012
 Vuelta Ciclista a León
1st  Points classification
1st Stage 5
 3rd Time trial, National Under-23 Road Championships
 4th Overall Tour Doon Hame
 5th Overall Rás Tailteann
1st  Young rider classification
 9th Clayton Velo Spring Classic
2013
 1st Clayton Velo Spring Classic
 3rd Ryedale Grand Prix
 4th Overall Rás Tailteann
 6th Grand Prix des Marbriers
2014
 1st Ryedale Grand Prix
 1st Stage 2 Tour de Korea
 5th Beaumont Trophy
 7th Overall Mzansi Tour
1st Prologue (TTT)
 10th Grand Prix des Marbriers
2015
 1st Round 5 - Durham, Tour Series
 5th Overall Tour de Korea
 5th Hitter Road Race
 8th Chorley Grand Prix
 10th Overall Tour de Yorkshire
2016
 5th Time trial, National Road Championships
 7th Overall Sibiu Cycling Tour

References

External links

1990 births
Living people
English male cyclists
English track cyclists
Sportspeople from Wigan